Chhay Than  is a Cambodian politician. He belongs to the Cambodian People's Party. 

Than became the head of the taxation department at the Minister of Finance of Kampuchea in 1981. He was Minister of Finance from 1986 to 1993. Later he became secretary of state, and then Minister of Planning in 1998. 

He was elected to represent Kandal Province in the National Assembly of Cambodia in 2003.

References 

Finance ministers of Cambodia
Government ministers of Cambodia
Members of the National Assembly (Cambodia)
Living people
Cambodian People's Party politicians
Year of birth missing (living people)